Birohi is a village in Chhanvey Mandal, Mirzapur District, Uttar Pradesh State. Birohi is located 5 km distance from its Mandal Main Town Chhanvey. Birohi is 13.1 km far from its District Main City Mirzapur. It is 240 km far from its State Main City Lucknow.

Demographics 

As of 2001 India census, Itahara Uparwar had a population of 3,952. Males constitute 52% (2066) of the population and females 48% (1886).

References 

Villages in Mirzapur district